Lynmore  is a suburb of Rotorua in the Bay of Plenty Region of New Zealand's North Island.

In April 2018, Lynmore had the highest house prices in Rotorua.

The local Apumoana Marae and Apumoana o te Ao Kohatu meeting house is  meeting place for the Tūhourangi hapū of Hurunga Te Rangi, Ngāti Kahupoko, Ngāti Taeotu and Ngāti Tumatawera.

Demographics

Lynmore had a population of 3,288 at the 2018 New Zealand census, an increase of 33 people (1.0%) since the 2013 census, and an increase of 159 people (5.1%) since the 2006 census. There were 1,179 households, comprising 1,596 males and 1,692 females, giving a sex ratio of 0.94 males per female. The median age was 41.7 years (compared with 37.4 years nationally), with 693 people (21.1%) aged under 15 years, 492 (15.0%) aged 15 to 29, 1,590 (48.4%) aged 30 to 64, and 513 (15.6%) aged 65 or older.

Ethnicities were 81.0% European/Pākehā, 16.8% Māori, 2.7% Pacific peoples, 11.9% Asian, and 2.1% other ethnicities. People may identify with more than one ethnicity.

The percentage of people born overseas was 24.5, compared with 27.1% nationally.

Although some people chose not to answer the census's question about religious affiliation, 54.4% had no religion, 34.7% were Christian, 0.4% had Māori religious beliefs, 1.4% were Hindu, 0.6% were Muslim, 0.4% were Buddhist and 2.3% had other religions.

Of those at least 15 years old, 816 (31.4%) people had a bachelor's or higher degree, and 273 (10.5%) people had no formal qualifications. The median income was $41,400, compared with $31,800 nationally. 669 people (25.8%) earned over $70,000 compared to 17.2% nationally. The employment status of those at least 15 was that 1,410 (54.3%) people were employed full-time, 426 (16.4%) were part-time, and 75 (2.9%) were unemployed.

Education

References

Suburbs of Rotorua
Populated places in the Bay of Plenty Region